Horace Lowe (10 August 1886 – 1966), commonly known as Harry Lowe, was an English footballer who played for Northwich Victoria, Brighton & Hove Albion, Tottenham Hotspur, Fulham and Beckenham.

Football career 
Lowe began his career at Northwich Victoria before joining Brighton & Hove Albion. In 1914 the centre half signed for Tottenham Hotspur. He played a total of 72 matches in all competitions between 1914–26 for the Spurs. He later played for Fulham and finally Beckenham Town .

Coaching career
He later managed Spanish side Real Sociedad between 1930 and 1935, and Espanyol in 1935. He played one match for Real Sociedad at the age of 48, which remains a record for the oldest player to play a match in the Spanish top division.

References 

1886 births
1966 deaths
Sportspeople from Northwich
Association football midfielders
English footballers
Northwich Victoria F.C. players
Brighton & Hove Albion F.C. players
Tottenham Hotspur F.C. players
Fulham F.C. players
Beckenham Town F.C. players
Real Sociedad footballers
English Football League players
Southern Football League players
English football managers
Real Sociedad managers
RCD Espanyol managers
Date of death missing
Place of death missing
English expatriate sportspeople in Spain